The Danziger Höhe (i.e. Danzig Heights; Kreis Danziger Höhe) was an administrative district founded in 1887 and dissolved in 1939. The district administration was based in the City of Danzig, which itself did not form part of the district but was an independent city (Stadtkreis). The area Danziger Höhe covered is now within Poland.

History
The district was formed from parts of the previous  within the Danzig Region in the province of West Prussia, within the Kingdom of Prussia, itself a part of Germany since 1871. In 1910, the district had 53,506 inhabitants, of which 23,955 were Protestant and 29,206 were Catholic. 9.7% had officially declared that they spoke the Kashubian language.

After the First World War, when the Treaty of Versailles came into effect in 1920, Danziger Höhe became a district in the new Free City of Danzig. The district was enlarged by a number of municipalities from neighbouring West Prussian districts of Neustadt, Karthaus, Berent and Dirschau, which otherwise became part of the Second Polish Republic as part of the Pomeranian Voivodeship. Some municipalities in the Danziger Höhe district were also ceded to Poland.

Demographics 
The district had a majority German population, with minorities of Kashubians and Poles.

Component cities and towns

References

Literature 
 Michael Rademacher: Deutsche Verwaltungsgeschichte Westpreußen, Kreis Danziger Höhe (2006) (in German).

Districts of West Prussia
1887 establishments in Germany
Free City of Danzig
History of Gdańsk
1939 disestablishments in Europe